A juzʼ (Arabic: جُزْءْ, plural:  ajzāʼ, literally meaning "part") is one of thirty parts of varying lengths into which the Quran is divided. It is also known as para (پارہ/পারা) in Iran and the Indian subcontinent. There are 30 juz in the quran.

Division into ajzāʼ has no relevance to the meaning of the Qurʼān and anyone can start reading. from anywhere in the Qurʼān. During medieval times, when it was too costly for most Muslims to purchase a manuscript, copies of the Qurʼān were kept in mosques and made accessible to people; these copies frequently took the form of a series of thirty parts (juzʼ). Some use these divisions to facilitate recitation of the Qurʼān in a month—such as during the Islamic month of Ramadan, when the entire Qurʼān is recited in the Tarawih prayers, typically at the rate of one juzʼ a night.

A juzʼ is further divided into ḥizbāni (lit. "two groups", singular: ḥizb, plural: aḥzāb), therefore, there are 60 aḥzāb. Each ḥizb (group) is subdivided into four quarters, making eight quarters per juzʼ, called maqraʼ (lit. "reading"). There are 240 of these quarters (maqraʼs) in the Qurʼān. These maqraʼ are often used as practical sections for revision when memorizing the Qurʼān.
 	
The most commonly memorized juzʼ is juzʼ ‘amma, the 30th juzʼ, containing chapters (sūrah) 78 through 114, with most of the shortest chapters of the Qurʼān. Juzʼ ‘amma is named, like most ajzāʼ, after the 1st word of its 1st verse (in this case chapter 78).

{| class="wikitable mw-collapsible"| style="text-align: center"
|+ class="nowrap" | The verse sections of each Rub el Hizb, an "1/8th" of a Juz', commonly used in reading the Qurʼān:
|-
!Ḥizb Number:
!1st Quarter
!2nd Quarter
!3rd Quarter
!4th Quarter
!Total:
|-
!1|32
(1:1-2:25)
|18
(2:26-2:43)
|16
(2:44-2:59)
|15
(2:60-2:74)
!81
|-
!2|17
(2:75-2:91)
|14
(2:92-2:105)
|18
(2:106-2:123)
|18
(2:124-2:141)
!67
|-
!3|16
(2:142-2:157)
|19
(2:158-2:176)
|12
(2:177-2:188)
|14
(2:189-2:202)
!61
|-
!4|16
(2:203-2:218)
|14
(2:219-2:232)
|10
(2:233-2:242)
|10
(2:243-2:252)
!50
|-
!5|10
(2:253-2:262)
|9
(2:263-2:271)
|11
(2:272-2:282)
|18
(2:283-3:14)
!48
|-
!6|18
(3:15-3:32)
|19
(3:33-3:51)
|23
(3:52-3:74)
|18
(3:75-3:92)
!78
|-
!7|20
(3:93-3:112)
|20
(3:113-3:132)
|20
(3:133-3:152)
|18
(3:153-3:170)
!78
|-
!8|15
(3:171-3:185)
|15
(3:186-3:200)
|11
(4:1-4:11)
|12
(4:12-4:23)
!53
|-
!9|12
(4:24-4:35)
|22
(4:36-4:57)
|16
(4:58-4:73)
|14
(4:74-4:87)
!64
|-
!10|12
(4:88-4:99)
|14
(4:100-4:113)
|21
(4:114-4:134)
|13
(4:135-4:147)
!60
|-
!11|15
(4:148-4:162)
|14
(4:163-4:176)
|11
(5:1-5:11)
|15
(5:12-5:26)
!55
|-
!12|14
(5:27-5:40)
|10
(5:41-5:50)
|16
(5:51-5:66)
|15
(5:67-5:82)
!55
|-
!13|15
(5:83-5:96)
|12
(5:97-5:108)
|24
(5:109-6:12)
|23
(6:13-6:35)
!74
|-
!14|23
(6:36-6:58)
|15
(6:59-6:73)
|21
(6:74-6:94)
|16
(6:95-6:110)
!75
|-
!15|16
(6:111-6:126)
|14
(6:127-6:140)
|10
(6:141-6:150)
|15
(6:151-6:165)
!55
|-
!16|30
(7:1-7:30)
|16
(7:31-7:46)
|18
(7:47-7:64)
|23
(7:65-7:87)
!87
|-
!17|29
(7:88-7:116)
|25
(7:117-7:141)
|14
(7:142-7:155)
|15
(7:156-7:170)
!83
|-
!18|18
(7:171-7:188)
|18
(7:189-7:206)
|21
(8:1-8:21)
|19
(8:22-8:40)
!76
|-
!19|20
(8:41-8:60)
|15
(8:61-8:75)
|18
(9:1-9:18)
|15
(9:19-9:33)
!68
|-
!20|12
(9:34-9:45)
|14
(9:46-9:59)
|15
(9:60-9:74)
|18
(9:75-9:92)
!59
|-
!21|18
(9:93-9:110)
|11
(9:111-9:121)
|18
(9:122-10:10)
|15
(10:11-10:25)
!62
|-
!22|27
(10:26-10:52)
|18
(10:53-10:70)
|19
(10:71-10:89)
|25
(10:90-11:5)
!89
|-
!23|18
(11:6-11:23)
|17
(11:24-11:40)
|20
(11:41-11:60)
|23
(11:61-11:83)
!78
|-
!24|24
(11:84-11:107)
|22
(11:108-12:6)
|23
(12:7-12:29)
|23
(12:30-12:52)
!92
|-
!25|24
(12:53-12:76)
|24
(12:77-12:100)
|15
(12:101-13:4)
|14
(13:5-13:18)
!77
|-
!26|16
(13:19-13:34)
|18
(13:35-14:9)
|18
(14:10-14:27)
|25
(14:28-14:52)
!77
|-
!27|48
(15:1-15:48)
|51
(15:49-15:99)
|29
(16:1-16:29)
|21
(16:30-16:50)
!149
|-
!28|24
(16:51-16:74)
|15
(16:75-16:89)
|21
(16:90-16:110)
|18
(16:111-16:128)
!78
|-
!29|22
(17:1-17:22)
|27
(17:23-17:49)
|20
(17:50-17:69)
|29
(17:70-17:98)
!98
|-
!30|29
(17:99-18:16)
|15
(18:17-18:31)
|19
(18:32-18:50)
|24
(18:51-18:74)
!87
|-
!31|24
(18:75-18:98)
|33
(18:99-19:21)
|37
(19:22-19:58)
|40
(19:59-19:98)
!134
|-
!32|54
(20:1-20:54)
|28
(20:55-20:82)
|28
(20:83-20:110)
|25
(20:111-20:135)
!135
|-
!33|28
(21:1-21:28)
|22
(21:29-21:50)
|32
(21:51-21:82)
|30
(21:83-21:112)
!112
|-
!34|18
(22:1-22:19)
|19
(22:20-22:37)
|22
(22:38-22:59)
|19
(22:60-22:78)
!78
|-
!35|35
(23:1-23:35)
|39
(23:36-23:74)
|44
(23:75-23:118)
|20
(24:1-24:20)
!138
|-
!36|14
(24:21-24:34)
|18
(24:35-24:52)
|12
(24:53-24:64)
|20
(25:1-25:20)
!64
|-
!37|32
(25:21-25:52)
|25
(25:53-25:77)
|51
(26:1-26:51)
|59
(26:52-26:110)
!167
|-
!38|70
(26:111-26:180)
|47
(26:181-26:227)
|26
(27:1-27:26)
|29
(27:27-27:55)
!172
|-
!39|26
(27:56-27:81)
|23
(27:82-28:11)
|17
(28:12-28:28)
|22
(28:29-28:50)
!88
|-
!40|25
(28:51-28:75)
|13
(28:76-28:88)
|25
(29:1-29:25)
|20
(29:26-29:45)
!83
|-
!41|24
(29:46-29:69)
|30
(30:1-30:30)
|23
(30:31-30:53)
|28
(30:54-31:21)
!105
|-
!42|23
(31:22-32:10)
|20
(32:11-32:30)
|17
(33:1-33:17)
|13
(33:18-33:30)
!73
|-
!43|20
(33:31-33:50)
|9
(33:51-33:59)
|23
(33:60-34:9)
|14
(34:10-34:23)
!66
|-
!44|22
(34:24-34:45)
|23
(34:46-35:14)
|26
(35:15-35:40)
|32
(35:41-36:27)
!103
|-
!45|32
(36:28-36:59)
|45
(36:60-37:21)
|61
(37:22-37:82)
|62
(37:83-37:144)
!200
|-
!46|58
(37:145-38:20)
|31
(38:21-38:51)
|44
(38:52-39:7)
|24
(39:8-39:31)
!157
|-
!47|21
(39:32-39:52)
|23
(39:53-39:75)
|20
(40:1-40:20)
|20
(40:21-40:40)
!84
|-
!48|25
(40:41-40:65)
|28
(40:66-41:8)
|16
(41:9-41:23)
|22
(41:24-41:46)
!91
|-
!49|20
(41:47-42:12)
|14
(42:13-42:26)
|24
(42:27-42:50)
|26
(42:51-43:23)
!84
|-
!50|33
(43:24-43:56)
|49
(43:57-44:16)
|54
(44:17-45:11)
|26
(45:12-45:37)
!162
|-
!51|20
(46:1-46:20)
|24
(46:21-47:9)
|23
(47:10-47:32)
|23
(47:33-48:17)
!90
|-
!52|12
(48:18-48:29)
|13
(49:1-49:13)
|31
(49:14-50:26)
|49
(50:27-51:31)
!105
|-
!53|53
(51:32-52:23)
|51
(52:24-53:25)
|45
(53:26-54:8)
|47
(54:9-54:55)
!196
|-
!54|78
(55:1-55:78)
|74
(56:1-56:74)
|37
(56:75-57:15)
|14
(57:16-57:29)
!203
|-
!55|13
(58:1-58:13)
|19
(58:14-59:10)
|20
(59:11-60:6)
|21
(60:7-61:14)
!73
|-
!56|14
(62:1-63:3)
|26
(63:4-64:18)
|12
(65:1-65:12)
|12
(66:1-66:12)
!64
|-
!57|30
(67:1-67:30)
|52
(68:1-68:52)
|70
(69:1-70:18)
|54
(70:19-71:28)
!206
|-
!58|47
(72:1-73:19)
|57
(73:20-74:56)
|58
(75:1-76:18)
|63
(76:19-77:50)
!225
|-
!59|86
(78:1-79:46)
|71
(80:1-81:29)
|55
(82:1-83:36)
|64
(84:1-86:17)
!276
|-
!60|75
(87:1-89:30)
|67
(90:1-93:11)
|67
(94:1-100:11)
|79
(101:1-114:6)
!288
|-
!Totals:
!1,642
!1,528
!1,548
!1,518
!6,236'''
|}

See alsoManzilRub el Hizb'

References

External links 
 Quran Juz with Tajwid in PDF format

Quranic exegesis